Hefty is a registered trademark of Pactiv Corporation.

Hefty may also refer to:

 Fred K. Hefty (1871–1925), an American politician
 Hefty Records, an independent record label
 Hefty Smurf, a male fictional character from The Smurfs

See also
 Hefti